Limousin is a former administrative region of southwest-central France. On 1 January 2016, it became part of the new administrative region of Nouvelle-Aquitaine. It comprised three departments: Corrèze, Creuse, and Haute-Vienne.

Forming part of the southwest of the country, Limousin is bordered by the regions of Centre-Val de Loire to the north, Auvergne to the east, Midi-Pyrénées to the south, Aquitaine to the southwest, and Poitou-Charentes to the west. Limousin is also part of the larger historical Occitania region.

Population 
The population of Limousin is aging and, until 1999, was declining. The department of Creuse has the oldest population of any in France. Between 1999 and 2004 the population of Limousin increased slightly, reversing a decline for the first time in decades.

Major communities 

 Brive-la-Gaillarde
 Guéret
 Limoges
 Panazol
 Saint-Junien
 Tulle
 Ussel

History 

Limousin is one of the traditional provinces of France. Its name derives from that of a Celtic tribe, the Lemovices, who had their capital at Saint-Denis-des-Murs and whose main sanctuary was recently found in Tintignac, a site which became a major site for Celtic studies thanks to unique objects which were found – such as the carnyces, unique in the whole Celtic world.

Viscount Aimar V of Limoges ( – ) was a notable ruler of the region.

Language 
Until the 1970s, Occitan was the primary language of rural areas. There remain several different Occitan dialects in use in Limousin, although their use is rapidly declining. These are:
 Limousin dialect
 Auvergnat dialect in the East/North-East
 Languedocien in the Southern fringe of Corrèze
 in the North, the Crescent transition area between Occitan and French is sometimes considered as a separate (basically Occitan) dialect called Marchois.

Transportation 
 The word limousine is derived from the name of the region. A particular type of carriage hood or roof physically resembled the raised hood of the cloak worn by the shepherds there.

Notable residents

From Corrèze

From Creuse

From Haute-Vienne

See also 
 Limousin (province), former province of France under the Ancien Régime.
 Limousin (cattle), breed of beef cattle bred in the Limousin region.
 Limousin (dialect), Occitan dialect of the region.
 TER Limousin

Footnotes

External links 
 Limousin : the “château d'eau” - Official French website (in English)
  Limousin regional council website, with a presentation video in English.
  Art in the Limousin region
  History and Geography (University of Limoges)

 
Massif Central
History of Nouvelle-Aquitaine
History of Corrèze
History of Dordogne
History of Haute-Vienne
Former regions of France
NUTS 2 statistical regions of the European Union
1956 establishments in France
States and territories established in 1956
2015 disestablishments in France
States and territories disestablished in 2015
France geography articles needing translation from French Wikipedia